Alberto P. León (1909-2001) was the Secretary of Health of Mexico beginning in 1939.  He is the 1991 holder of the Mexican National Prize on Medicine and Health.

Biography
León was born in Irapuato, Mexico, on July 12, 1909 and died on August 4th 2001 in Mexico City. 
He gained his BS degree at the Preparatory School of Aguascalientes in 1926; his MD at the National University of Mexico in 1933; and MPH degree at the Harvard School of Public Health, USA in 1936. At Harvard he studied under Hans Zinsser. He was Professor of Bacteriology and Immunology at the School of Medicine, National University of México from 1946 to 1950 and since 1946 Professor of Clinics for Infections Diseases.

He worked for the Department of Public Health from 1930 to 1934, doing his residency with the Medical Emergency Services of the City of Mexico during 1932 to 1933. He was Consulting Physician of the Department of Public Welfare of Mexico in 1933 and held similar post plus that of Chief of Internal Medicine of the Spanish Hospital of Mexico City from 1933 to 1934.

In 1939 León was appointed General Secretary of Health in the Mexican Secretariat of Health.

For his studies at the Harvard School of Public Health during 1934 to 1936, León received a Fellowship from the Rockefeller Foundation.

In 1936 he became Technical Supervisor of the Department of Public Health in Mexico, after which he was Founder and Director of the Office of Epidemiology, of the same Department, from 1937 to 1940 and Founder and Director of the Institute of the BCG of Mexico from 1948 to 1965.

From 1938 to 1988 he worked as a professor at the Institute for Tropical Diseases in Mexico (Instituto de Enfermedades Tropicales).

In addition to his previously mentioned academic posts, he was Professor of Immunology, School of Biological Sciences, National Polytechnic Institute of Mexico, 1945 to 1950; Professor of Epidemiology, Immunology and Bacteriology, School of Public Health, 1938 to 1950; Professor, School of Medicine, University of California at Los Angeles, 1950. Leon was a leading expert on public health issues in Mexico, especially the vaccination campaign against tuberculosis.

León was fellow of six national societies, President of three of them, and a member of seven international societies. From 1946 to 1949 he was President of the Mexican Society for Geography and Statistics (Sociedad Mexicana de Geografía y Estadística), the first scientific society founded 1833 in America.

In 1948 he was Chief of the Mexican Delegation of the World Health Assembly in Geneva, during which his initiative and efforts helped to establish the Division of Environmental Sanitation and the Panel on Brucellosis.

He received the first award of Physiology of the Mexican Society of Internal Medicine and the Gold Medal and Diploma for Public Health Merit of the Department of Public Health and Public Assistance. Silver Medal, Gold Medal and Diplomas for 25, 30 and 35 years of Professorship of the School of Medicine National University of Mexico, have been awarded to him and other honours include: Gold Medal and Diploma for Health Merit, Mexican Public Health Association; Diplom for the Foundation and Distinguished Services, National Committee Against Tuberculosis, Mexico.

Honorary membership Inter American Statistical Institute. For 40 years León was member and vice president of the 
American Public Health Association.

He published 1992 his book 50 Years Of Investigation In Mexico Marquéz López Editorial Inc.

In 1979 Leon started to conduct a research on cancer treatment. Unfortunately because of his old age he could not publish a scientific publication of the successful therapies cases applied. Nevertheless, he was able to cure some cases of cancer sick patients in his practice, and most of those where hopeless cases.

He married 1934 María del Refugio Lomelí Sánchez in Mexico City and they raised 9 children.

References

The author taken from: International Who's Who of Intellectuals.
Quiminet entry on Leon

External link

1909 births
2001 deaths
Mexican public health doctors
Mexican expatriates in the United States
National Autonomous University of Mexico alumni
David Geffen School of Medicine at UCLA faculty
Harvard School of Public Health alumni